Ramani may refer to:
 Ramana, Azerbaijan
 N. Ramani (1934–2015), Indian Carnatic music flautist
 Ramani Suryakantham Durvasula, American psychologist.